Robert Hersant (30 January 1920 – 21 April 1996) was a French newspaper magnate. He was a leader in the pro-Nazi youth movement during the Vichy wartime years, but after prison time built a major newspaper empire and engaged in conservative politics.  At the time of his death he operated 40 publications and employed 8,000 people, but failed in his leap into television.

Early life 
Hersant was born in Vertou, Loire-Atlantique.  . He was the son of a captain in the
merchant navy and showed early on an interest in school newspapers.

Vichy France
Initially involved with the Socialist Youth movement in 1935, Robert Hersant founded the rightist political party Jeune Front in the summer 1940. During that period, he became a friend of Jean-Marie Balestre. Jeune Front although a  small group, was publishing the pro-Nazi newspaper Au Pilori. He left this movement in October 1940, to become a member of the secretariat general de la jeunesse of the Vichy Regime. In 1941–1942, he created a camp in Brévannes, named after the Marshal Philippe Pétain to indoctrinate young people in the Révolution nationale ideology.   He was not affected in the first waves of the Épuration légale after liberation. He was arrested and jailed for one month in Fresnes on 15 June 1945. He was tried in 1947 and sentenced to 10 years of national indignity for collaboration with Nazi Germany. The court emphasized that Jeune Front had received support from the Nazis as early as August 1940 to justify that sentence.

Publishing and politics
He was released through the general amnesties in 1947, 1951 and 1953. His personal friendships with notable Socialist leaders such as Guy Mollet and François Mitterrand during the 1950s enabled him to start fresh. After launching a few unsuccessful publications, (Bazars et Galeries, l'Equipement Ménager, le Quincailler), in 1950, he started L'Auto-Journal, which met success due to the increasing popularity of automobiles.

In October 1952, he bought la semaine de l'Oise and used it to launch his political career. In February 1953, he was elected mayor of Ravenel, Oise, and in January 1956 he ran for a deputy seat in the Assemblée Nationale as a radical candidate. He was elected with the support of French Section of the Workers' International (SFIO) and Democratic and Socialist Union of the Resistance (UDSR). However, on 18 April 1956 his election caused a heated debate at the Assemblée Nationale due to his collaborationist past. The Assemblée Nationale cancelled his election, but on 25 October 1956 he was reelected. As a deputy, Hersant championed a reform of the constitution of 1946, altering the articles 45, 46, 47, 48 and 52. It would have permitted the direct election of the Président du Conseil, and would have obliged him to form his cabinet from personalities that did not belong to legislative bodies.

Hersant advocated a partition of Algeria as a solution to the Algerian War. In 1958, Hersant became Gaullist. In 1967, he was elected as a Radical within the Federation of the Democratic and Socialist Left. He then became a conservative supporting Valéry Giscard d'Estaing. He remained a deputy until 1978. In 1984, he became a deputy in the European Parliament on the Rally for the Republic–Union for French Democracy (RPR/UDF) list led by Simone Veil. He remained a European Deputy until his death.

He gradually built his empire by buying or creating local or regional newspapers through his holding company Socpresse (and its associate France-Antilles). In 1957, he created Centre Presse and in 1964, France-Antilles. Robert Hersant also took control of  various regional titles such as Le Courrier de l'Ouest, Nord Matin (bought in 1967), Paris Normandie (bought in 1972), Nord Eclair (bought in 1975, and merged with Nord Matin).

In 1975, he purchased from Jean Prouvost the great conservative newspaper le Figaro (with the help of Pierre Juillet and Marie-France Garaud, then adviser of Jacques Chirac), in 1976 the popular daily France-Soir,  and in 1980 acquired "L'Aurore" from the estate of Marcel Boussac. At the time, it was rumored that president Giscard d'Estaing had facilitated the obtaining of loans by Hersant in order to have the three Parisian newspapers (totalling 1.06 million in circulation) controlled by a political ally. In 1979, Hersant launched Le Figaro-Magazine, a weekly supplement of Le Figaro, headed by Louis Pauwels.  In 1980, Le Figaro absorbed L'Aurore. In 1983, Hersant bought Le Dauphiné Libéré, in 1986, Le Progrès de Lyon and l'Union de Reims, and in 1987 Les Nouvelles Calédoniennes. As a result, in 1986, according to Daniel Singer,  he was controlling 38% of the national press, and 26% of the regional press in France.

After the fall of the Berlin Wall, Hersant extended his activities to eastern Europe. In 1991, he bought Magyar Nemzet (Hungary), 51% of Rzeczpospolita (Poland), Tempo, Dziennik Baltycki, Dziennik Lodzki, Trybuna Slaska, Express Ilustrowany, Wieczor Wybrzeza, Dziennik Zachodni and Gazeta Krakowska. This large number of acquisitions gained him the nicknames of Citizen H and Le Papivore in the satirist Le Canard enchaîné.

In 1987, he was involved with Silvio Berlusconi in the launching of the La Cinq TV-channel. He withdrew in 1990 after suffering serious losses. La Cinq collapsed in 1992.

Robert Hersant's group was, in 1996, employing 8,000 persons, and generating a revenue of 6 billion French francs.

Death
He died at Saint-Cloud in 1996. After his death of Hersant, Socpresse was sold to Serge Dassault.

List of papers owned by Robert Hersant in 1996

France 
 Le Figaro
 France-Soir
 le Progrès (Lyon)
 le Journal de Saône et Loire
 Le Bien public (Dijon)
 le Courrier de l'Ouest Angers
 le Dauphiné Libéré (Grenoble)
 Presse Océan (Nantes)
 l'Eclair (Nantes)
 Centre presse (Poitiers)
 le Maine libre (Le Mans)
 Le Havre presse
 Le Havre libre
 la Liberté du Morbihan
 l'Union (Reims)
 l'Ardennais
 Nord-Eclair
 Nord-Matin
 Paris-Normandie
 les Dernières Nouvelles d'Alsace
 L'Est Républicain
 l'Est éclair
 Libération Champagne (not to be confused with Libération)
 la Haute-Marne libérée
 France-Antilles Martinique
 France-Antilles Guadeloupe
 la Dépêche de Tahiti
 le Quotidien de la Réunion

Belgium 
 42% of the capital of Le Soir

Poland 
 One national daily, and one sports daily

Czech Republic 
 One national and four regional dailies

Slovakia 
 two dailies

See also 
Antennes Locales

Further reading
 Chalaby, Jean K. "The Press, 1945–69." in The de Gaulle Presidency and the Media;; (Palgrave Macmillan, London, 2002) pp. 3-22.
 Palmer, Michael, and Jeremy Tunstall. "Media moguls in France." Media Moguls'' (Routledge, 2006) pp. 145–171.

References 
 Biography of Robert Hersant from 1920 to 1958 
 Nord Matin, Nord Eclair, La Voix du Nord 
 Dauphiné Libéré and Progrès de Lyon 
 Robert Hersant and Socpresse
 Robert Hersant chronology 
 Paul Lewis Robert Hersant The New York Times, April 23, 1996. 
 Janice Castro The Man Who Would Be King TIME Magazine Monday, Dec. 22, 1980.  
 Daniel Singer  The Politics and the Pity The Nation, May 12, 1979.
 Chronology of the acquisition by Hersant 
 Daniel Singer  Handicapping the French Elections The Nation, March 15, 1986.
 Renaud Revel Les derniers bouclages de Robert Hersant L'Express, October 22, 1994. 
 Marc Blachère La Mort du Magnat de la Presse Robert Hersant L'Humanité April 22, 1996.
 L'empire Hersant L'Humanité April 22, 1996.
 

1920 births
1996 deaths
People from Loire-Atlantique
Hersant family
Politicians from Pays de la Loire
Radical Party (France) politicians
Union of Democrats for the Republic politicians
Union for French Democracy politicians
Democratic Convention (France) politicians
Deputies of the 3rd National Assembly of the French Fourth Republic
Deputies of the 1st National Assembly of the French Fifth Republic
Deputies of the 2nd National Assembly of the French Fifth Republic
Deputies of the 3rd National Assembly of the French Fifth Republic
Deputies of the 4th National Assembly of the French Fifth Republic
Deputies of the 5th National Assembly of the French Fifth Republic
Deputies of the 8th National Assembly of the French Fifth Republic
Conservatism in France
20th-century French newspaper publishers (people)
French magazine publishers (people)
French newspaper chain founders
French male writers
Burials at Passy Cemetery
20th-century French male writers
French magazine founders